Eucalyptus pauciflora subsp. acerina, commonly known as snow gum, is a mallee or small tree that is endemic to a small area of Victoria, Australia. It has smooth, shiny bark, glossy green lance-shaped to egg-shaped leaves, flower buds in groups of between nine and fifteen, white flowers and hemispherical or conical fruit. It differs from other subspecies of E. pauciflora in having a dense crown and no parts that are glaucous.

Description
It has smooth, shiny, white, cream-coloured, grey and green bark that is shed in ribbons. Flowering has been recorded in January and the flowers are white. Subspecies acerina differs from others in the species in having a dense crown and no glaucous parts.

Taxonomy and naming
Eucalyptus pauciflora subsp. acerina was first formally described in 1994 by Kevin James Rule in the journal Muelleria, from material collected on Mount Erica in Baw Baw National Park. The epithet (acerina) is from Latin, referring to the absence of surface wax on adult plants.

Distribution and habitat
This subspecies is only known from the Baw Baw plateau and the nearby Mount Useful.

References

pauciflora
Flora of Victoria (Australia)
Plants described in 1994